Willibert Kremer (15 October 1939 – 24 December 2021) was a German football coach and player. He died on 24 December 2021, at the age of 82.

Honours

As a coach
 DFB-Pokal finalist: 1974–75

References

1939 births
2021 deaths
German footballers
Association football midfielders
Borussia Mönchengladbach players
FC Viktoria Köln players
Hertha BSC players
MSV Duisburg players
Bundesliga players
German football managers
Bayer 04 Leverkusen managers
MSV Duisburg managers
TSV 1860 Munich managers
Fortuna Düsseldorf managers
Eintracht Braunschweig managers
Tennis Borussia Berlin managers
Bundesliga managers
2. Bundesliga managers
People from Rhein-Kreis Neuss
Sportspeople from Düsseldorf (region)
Footballers from North Rhine-Westphalia